Jeremy Woodhead is a British make-up artist. He was nominated for an Academy Award in the category Best Makeup and Hairstyling for the film Judy.

Selected filmography 
 Judy (2019)

References

External links 

Living people
Year of birth missing (living people)
Place of birth missing (living people)
British make-up artists